Acer yangbiense is a species of maple with a very restricted distribution in Yunnan, China, only known from around ten specimens from a single locality on the western slope of Mount Cangshan in Yangbi County.

The leaves are five-lobed and large, up to 20 cm long and 25 cm across, again with clear pubescence on the veins on the underside of the leaves.

References

External links
photo of herbarium specimen at Missouri Botanical Garden, collected in Yunnan in 2002
line drawings for Flora of China

yangbiense
Plants described in 2003
Endemic flora of Yunnan
Trees of China
Endangered plants